Choi Chan In (Chinese: 蔡振賢; born 28 August 1992 in Macau) is a Macanese footballer who currently works a fitness coach for Hong Kong Premier League club Lee Man. He also plays for the Macau national football team.

References

1992 births
Macau footballers
Living people
Macau international footballers
Association football defenders